Indianapolis Chair Manufacturing Company, also known as the Indianapolis Warehouse, was a historic factory complex located at Indianapolis, Indiana.  It was between built 1891 and 1893, and consisted of three sections.  It included two large six-story brick sections with segmental arched windows and an eight-story corner tower. It has been demolished and replaced by an apartment complex.

It was listed on the National Register of Historic Places in 1984 and delisted in 1986.

References

Former National Register of Historic Places in Indiana
Industrial buildings and structures on the National Register of Historic Places in Indiana
Industrial buildings completed in 1893
Buildings and structures in Indianapolis
National Register of Historic Places in Indianapolis